Simalia is a genus of snakes in the family Pythonidae.

Taxonomy
Simalia , was considered a taxonomic synonym of
Liasis (a genus of non-venomous pythons found in Indonesia, New Guinea and Australia) and
Morelia (a genus of large snakes, in the family Pythonidae, found in Australia, Indonesia and New Guinea), 
but Reynolds et al. (2014) resurrected the genus for the Morelia amethistina species group (which, together with Morelia viridis, had made the genus Morelia paraphyletic).

Species
The genus Simalia contains the following species:

As of June 2022, ITIS and the IUCN Red List also identify the Oenpelli python as Simalia oenpelliensis, while The Reptile Database places it in the monotypic genus Nyctophilopython.

Nota bene: A binomial authority in parentheses indicates that the species was originally described in a genus other than Simalia.

References

Further reading
Gray JE (1849). Catalogue of the Specimens of Snakes in the Collection of the British Museum. London: Trustees of the British Museum. (Edward Newman, printer). xv + 125 pp. (Simalia, new genus, p. 91).

Snake genera
Pythonidae
Taxa named by John Edward Gray